The 2020–21 UNC Greensboro Spartans men's basketball team represented the University of North Carolina at Greensboro during the 2020–21 NCAA Division I men's basketball season. The Spartans, led by tenth-year head coach Wes Miller, play most of their home games at the Greensboro Coliseum in Greensboro, North Carolina, with a handful of games at Fleming Gymnasium, on the UNCG campus. They are members of the Southern Conference.  They finished the season 21-8, 13-5 to finish in 1st place. They defeated The Citadel, East Tennessee State, and Mercer to win the SoCon Championship. They received an automatic bid to the NCAA Tournament where they lost in the Round of 64 to Florida State.

Previous season 
The Spartans finished the 2019–20 season 23–9, 13–3 in SoCon play to finish in third place. They lost in the quarterfinals of SoCon tournament to Chattanooga. Although being a good postseason candidate with 23 wins, all postseason tournaments were cancelled amid the COVID-19 pandemic. 

Guard Isaiah Miller was named Southern Conference Men's Basketball Player of the Year, only the second Spartan to earn that honor. He was also named conference Defensive Player of the Year and named to the All-Southern Conference first-team, his second consecutive season for both. Senior forward James Dickey was named to the All-Southern Conference third-team and Freshman guard Keyshaun Langley was named to the All-Southern Conference Freshman Team.

Roster

Schedule and results 

|-
!colspan=9 style=| Non-conference Regular season 

|-
!colspan=12 style=|SoCon regular season

|-
!colspan=9 style=| SoCon tournament

|-
!colspan=9 style=| NCAA tournament

Source:

Awards and honors

Southern Conference honors

Southern Conference Player of the Year
Isaiah Miller

Southern Conference Defensive Player of the Year
Isaiah Miller

All-SoCon First Team
Isaiah Miller

References

UNC Greensboro Spartans men's basketball seasons
UNC Greensboro
UNC Greensboro Spartans men's basketball
UNC Greensboro Spartans men's basketball
UNC Greensboro